Paul Dufauret (17 August 1900 – 13 March 1973) was a French athlete. He competed in the men's pole vault at the 1924 Summer Olympics.

References

External links
 

1900 births
1973 deaths
Athletes (track and field) at the 1924 Summer Olympics
French male pole vaulters
Olympic athletes of France
Place of birth missing